Jorge Sebastián Barclay (born 2 January 1978) is a former Argentine footballer who played for clubs of Argentina, Chile, Guatemala, Venezuela and Canada.

Career
Born in La Plata (Buenos Aires), Barclay started playing football with the youth teams of local side Gimnasia y Esgrima de La Plata. The forward made his senior debut for Gimnasia in the 1998 Copa CONMEBOL, and made his Primera División Argentina debut entering as a second half substitute against Club Atlético Lanús on 18 June 1999. He went on a six-month loan to Club Atlético Tigre in 2000, and left Gimnasia in 2001 after making only eight Primera División appearances for the club.

Barclay scored 19 goals for newly promoted Chilean Primera División side Deportes Temuco in 2002, before signing for A-League club Toronto Lynx in 2003. Barclay scored a goal in his debut for the Lynx, a 2–0 victory over the Pittsburgh Riverhounds on 3 May 2003.

After his first stint with Toronto, Barclay joined Venezuelan second-tier club Deportivo Italchacao and Guatemalan club Deportivo Marquense.

Teams
 Gimnasia y Esgrima de La Plata 1999
 Tigre 2000-2001
 Villa Mitre de Bahía Blanca 2001
 Deportes Temuco 2002
 Toronto Lynx 2003-2004
 Deportivo Italchacao 2005
 Deportivo Marquense 2006
 Toronto Lynx 2006-2007
 Villa San Carlos 2007-2008
 Deportivo Laferrere 2008
 Villa San Carlos 2009

References

External links
 
 Sebastián Jorge Barclay (El Gordo) at En Una Baldosa 

1978 births
Living people
Footballers from La Plata
Argentine footballers
Argentine expatriate footballers
Club de Gimnasia y Esgrima La Plata footballers
Club Atlético Tigre footballers
Deportes Temuco footballers
Argentine Primera División players
Chilean Primera División players
Expatriate footballers in Chile
Expatriate footballers in Guatemala
Expatriate footballers in Venezuela
Expatriate soccer players in Canada
Toronto Lynx players
A-League (1995–2004) players
Association football forwards